La Statira is an opera seria in three acts by the Italian composer Tomaso Albinoni with a libretto by Apostolo Zeno and Pietro Pariati. It was first performed at the Teatro Capranica in Rome during the Carnival season of 1726. The plot concerns the rivalry between Statira and Barsimo for the throne of Persia.

The singers in the premiere performance were:

References

Further reading
Holden, Amanda (ed.), The Viking Opera Guide, Viking, 1993

Operas by Tomaso Albinoni
Operas set in ancient Persia
Operas
Italian-language operas
1726 operas